Tunliu is a district of the city of Changzhi, Shanxi province, China. Lord Chang'an, Chengjiao, brother of Qin Shi Huang, died here.

Climate

References

www.xzqh.org 

County-level divisions of Shanxi
Changzhi